Maira Bes-Rastrollo is a professor of preventive medicine and public health at the University of Navarra whose research on ultra-processed food has been widely covered in the media.

References

External links 
https://unav.academia.edu/MairaBesRastrollo
https://www.researchgate.net/profile/Maira_Bes-Rastrollo

Living people
Year of birth missing (living people)
Academic staff of the University of Navarra
Spanish public health doctors
Place of birth missing (living people)